Emily Hirst (born July 9, 1993) is a Canadian actress.

Career
Hirst was born in Vancouver, British Columbia, Canada. Hirst first appeared in the TV series The Twilight Zone in 2002 and she has a small role in X2: X-Men United as The "Ice Cream Girl" in 2003.

Her first larger role was in the film drama Desolation Sound, where she played Margaret Elliot. For this role she was nominated for a Leo Award in 2005. She played Laura in the Lifetime movie For the Love of a Child in 2006. She won a Young Artists Award for that role. She was also nominated for her supporting guest role in Smallville's "Fragile" (2006). In 2007, Hirst had a recurring role as the childlike vampire Charlotte on Spike TV's Blade: The Series with rapper Sticky Fingaz. Her next appearance was in the thriller Mem-o-re with Billy Zane as Bonnie McHale.

In 2007 Hirst played Mandy Tarr in the Lifetime movie Passion's Web and Young Mary in Second Sight. She also appeared briefly in Battlestar Galactica: Razor. Her next role was Alice in a movie called The Egg Factory which was renamed Prodigy, and featured a number of times on Movie Central.

In 2008, Hirst played Makoto Konno in the English dubbed version of the award-winning Japanese anime film The Girl Who Leapt Through Time alongside Andrew Francis, for which she is nominated for a Young Artists Award in 2009. Also in 2008, Hirst appeared in a made-for-TV movie with Daryl Hannah called Storm Seekers.

In February 2009, she filmed Stranger With My Face with Alexz Johnson, Catherine Hicks, and Andrew Francis.

Filmography

Awards
Leo Awards
 2005 - Nominated - Feature Length Drama: Best Supporting Performance by a Female for: Desolation Sound (2005)

Young Artist Awards
 2007 - Won - Best Performance in a TV Movie, Miniseries or Special (Comedy or Drama) - Supporting Young Actress for: "For the Love of a Child" (2006) (TV)
 2007 - Nominated - Best Performance in a TV Series (Comedy or Drama) - Guest Starring Young Actress for: "Smallville" (2001)
 2009 - Won - Best Performance in a Voice-Over Role - Young Actress for: "The Girl Who Leapt Through Time" (English version) (2008)

References

External links

 Pictures at ChildStarlets.com
 UGO.com Film/TV - Emily Hirst Interview
 IGN Interview: Blade: The Series's Emily Hirst
 Planete Smallville Interview

1993 births
Canadian child actresses
Canadian television actresses
Living people
Actresses from Vancouver
21st-century Canadian actresses
Canadian film actresses
Canadian voice actresses